In human anatomy, inferior epigastric vessels refers to the inferior epigastric artery and inferior epigastric vein.

See also 
Terms for anatomical location
Hesselbach's triangle

External links
Hesselbach's triangle - fpnotebook.com

Abdomen